Katharine Elizabeth Garde (September 19, 1905 – December 25, 1989) was an American stage, radio, film and television actress.

Early years
Born in Philadelphia, Garde was starring in productions of South Philadelphia's Broadway Players by age 15. She attended the University of Pennsylvania.

Stage
On the stage since the early 1920s, Garde made her Broadway debut as Alma Borden in Easy Come, Easy Go (1925–1926) and played character roles in productions including The Social Register (1931–1932) and The Primrose Path (1939). A tall woman, standing 5'10", she was cast as Aunt Eller in the original 1943 Broadway production of Oklahoma! She also portrayed Mrs. Gordon in Agatha Sue, I Love You (1966).

Radio
After joining CBS in 1933, Garde began to work extensively in radio, performing on some three dozen shows including Lorenzo Jones, Mrs. Wiggs of the Cabbage Patch, The Big Story, The Eddie Cantor Show (on which she played "all the women roles"), Front Page Farrell, Maudie's Diary, Perry Mason, Theatre Guild on the Air and The Fat Man. In 1934 Garde worked with Orson Welles on the CBS Radio series The American School of the Air, and she later performed in Welles' radio series including Les Misérables, The Mercury Theatre on the Air, The Campbell Playhouse and Ceiling Unlimited.

Film
Garde's first three credited Hollywood film roles are in the early "talkies" The Lady Lies (1929), Damaged Love (1930), and Queen High (1930). Among her more notable later performances are in the film noir productions Call Northside 777 (1948), in which she plays a prosecution witness whose testimony convicts an innocent man; in Cry of the City (1948) as Miss Pruett; and in Caged (1950), as a murderous prison inmate.

Television
Her television credits include playing Belle Starr on the January 27, 1952 episode of The Gabby Hayes Show. Garde also made appearances on The Honeymooners as the Kramdens' maid, Thelma; on The Real McCoys as a farmer, Aggie Larkin; and on two episodes of The Twilight Zone, including "The Midnight Sun", opposite Lois Nettleton.

Death
Betty Garde died December 25, 1989, at the age of 84 in a hospital in Sherman Oaks, California. No cause was given and there were no immediate survivors. Her body was returned to her home state of Pennsylvania and interred at Westminster Cemetery in Bala Cynwyd.

Filmography

References

External links

Betty Garde Digital Gallery at the University of Maryland Library 
Betty Garde papers at the University of Maryland Library 

Actresses from Philadelphia
American film actresses
American stage actresses
American television actresses
American radio actresses
American musical theatre actresses
1905 births
1989 deaths
20th-century American actresses
20th-century American singers
20th-century American women singers